The Stranger from Texas is a 1939 American Western film directed by Sam Nelson and starring Charles Starrett, Lorna Gray and the Sons of the Pioneers.

Cast list
 Charles Starrett as Tom Murdock/Tom Morgan
 Lorna Gray as Jean Browning
 Richard Fiske as Ned Browning
 Dick Curtis as Bat Stringer
 Edmund Cobb as Carver
 Bob Nolan as Bob
 Al Bridge as Jeff Browning
 Jack Rockwell as Sheriff Fletcher
 Hal Taliaferro as Clay Billings
 Edward Le Saint as Dan Murdock
 Sons of the Pioneers

External links

References

Columbia Pictures films
American Western (genre) films
Films directed by Sam Nelson
1939 Western (genre) films
1939 films
American black-and-white films
1930s American films